Bernardo Martorana (April 25, 1846 in Palermo – after 1891 ) was an Italian painter, active in Sicily painting historical and landscape subjects.

He studied mainly engraving and acquaforte under Aloisio Juvara at the Institute of Fine Arts of Naples. He was known for his ability detailing the bony anatomy. He exhibited L'Alfa e l'Omega in 1883 at the Mostra Italo-Spagnuola held at Berlin. At the 1875 Promotrice Salvator Rosa of Naples, he displayed La donna emancipata. At the same exhibition in 1876, Gioie intime; in 1877, Studio di paesaggio (pencil); in 1880, La figlia del colono; in 1883, Col cane da punta; in 1884, Commedia eterna; in 1885, Veri amici; and in 1891, Cacciando in montagna.

References

19th-century Italian painters
Italian male painters
1846 births
Painters from Palermo
Italian genre painters
Year of death missing
19th-century Italian male artists